Joseph Bell  Kemp (July 1, 1844 - July 13, 1917) was an American recipient of the Medal of Honor and soldier in the Union Army during the American Civil War.

Biography 
Kemp was born in Lima, Allen Country, Ohio on July 1, 1844. He served as first sergeant with Company D of the 5th Michigan Volunteer Infantry Regiment during the Civil War. He earned his medal in action during the Battle of the Wilderness, Virginia on May 6, 1864. Kemp was captured at the Battle of Petersburg and was briefly held as a prisoner. By the wars conclusion, Kemp had reached the rank of captain and was mustered out in July 1865. His medal was issued on December 1, 1864. He died on July 13, 1917, in Ann Arbor, Michigan.

Medal of Honor Citation 
For extraordinary heroism on 6 May 1864, in action during the Wilderness Campaign, Virginia, for capture of flag of 31st North Carolina (Confederate States of America) in a personal encounter.

References 

1844 births
1917 deaths
American Civil War recipients of the Medal of Honor
Union Army officers
United States Army Medal of Honor recipients